Berezhany Raion was a raion (district) in the westernmost corner of Ternopil Oblast (province) in western Ukraine, area traditionally known as Halychyna (Galicia). The administrative center was the city of Berezhany, some 50 km away from Ternopil and ca 80 km away from Lviv. Berezhany was separately incorporated as a city of oblast significance and did not belong to the raion. The Zolota Lypa river, a tributary of the Dniester tributary crossed the district from the north to the south. The river forms a large lake north of Berezhany. The raion was abolished on 18 July 2020 as part of the administrative reform of Ukraine, which reduced the number of raions of Ternopil Oblast to three. The area of Berezhany Raion was merged into Ternopil Raion. The area of the raion was 661 km². There were 54 villages and 1 town (Berezhany) in the raion.

At the time of disestablishment, the raion consisted of three hromadas:
 Berezhany urban hromada with the administration in Berezhany, also included Berezhany Municipality;
 Naraiv rural hromada with the administration in the selo of Naraiv;
 Saranchuky rural hromada with the administration in the selo of Saranchuky.

Villages
There were the following villages in the raion (Ukrainian and Polish / Russian spellings are given):

Villages are ranked after size

Naraiv (Нараїв / Narajów) - 1.799 inhabitants (river Narayivka flows through the village) 
Shybalyn (Шибалин / Szybalyn) - 1.359 inhabitants (first mention dates to 1451)
Zhukiv (Жуків / Zuków) - 929 inhabitants
Rohachyn (Рогачин / Rogachin) - 886 inhabitants
Saranchuky (Саранчуки / Saranchuki) - 880 inhabitants
Verbiv (Вербів / Werbów) - 865 inhabitants 
Kuryany (Куряни / Kuriany, Kurzany) - 831 inhabitants
Vilkhovets (Вільховець / Olchowiec) - 765 inhabitants 
Bozhykiv (Божиків / Bozyków) - 670 inhabitants (village was known as Pryvitne in 1964–1991. First historical mention dates to 1443) 
Urman (Урмань) - 622 inhabitants
Bishche (Біще / Biszcze) - 547 inhabitants (first historical mention dates to 1086)
Poruchyn (Поручин / Poruczin) - 503 inhabitants 
Trostianets (Тростянець) - 428 inhabitants
Rybnyky (Рибники / Rybniki) - 323 inhabitants 
Pidvysoke (Підвисоке / Podwysokie) - 317 inhabitants
Baranivka (Баранівка / Baranówka) - 250 inhabitants 
Pavliv (Павлів / Pawlów) - 191 inhabitants (first mention dates to 1488)
Baznykivka (Базниківка/Baznikówka) - 116 inhabitants (first historical mention dates to 1731)

See also
Subdivisions of Ukraine

References

External links

Verkhovna Rada website — Berezhany Raion
List of villages in Berezhany raion

Former raions of Ternopil Oblast
1939 establishments in Ukraine
Ukrainian raions abolished during the 2020 administrative reform